Farzad Mansouri (born 19 March 2002) is an Afghan taekwondo practitioner. At the 2020 Summer Olympics, Mansouri and Kamia Yousufi carried Afghanistan's flag at the Opening Ceremony.

Career 
Farzad Mansouri won a silver medal the 2019 Asian Junior Taekwondo Championships in Amman. In 2021, Mansouri won a bronze medal in the 74 kg weight category at the 2021 Beirut Open Taekwondo Tournament. Mansouri will compete at the 2020 Olympics in the men's +80 kg event. He received a scholarship from the IOC as part of its Olympic Solidarity programme.

Personal life 
After the Fall of Kabul in 2021, he left the city.

See also 
 Afghanistan at the 2020 Summer Olympics
 List of flag bearers for Afghanistan at the Olympics

References

External links
 

2002 births
Living people
Afghan male taekwondo practitioners
Taekwondo practitioners at the 2020 Summer Olympics
Olympic taekwondo practitioners of Afghanistan